FAD reductase (NAD(P)H) (GTNG_3158 (gene)) is an enzyme with systematic name FADH2:NAD(P)+ oxidoreductase. This enzyme catalyses the following chemical reaction

 FADH2 + NAD(P)+  FAD + NAD(P)H + H+

This enzyme is isolated from the bacterium Geobacillus thermodenitrificans. It takes part in degradation tryptophan.

References

External links 
 

EC 1.5.1